Stadion  is a station on  of the Vienna U-Bahn. It is located in the Leopoldstadt District. It opened in 2008.

The station serves the Ernst Happel Stadion, which is located to the south.

References

External links 
 

Buildings and structures in Leopoldstadt
Railway stations opened in 2008
2008 establishments in Austria
Vienna U-Bahn stations
Railway stations in Austria opened in the 21st century